The Cameroon Handball Federation (CHF) is the administrative and controlling body for handball and beach handball in the Republic of Cameroon. Founded in 1970, CHF is a member of African Handball Confederation (CAHB) and the International Handball Federation (IHF).

National teams
 Cameroon men's national handball team
 Cameroon men's national junior handball team
 Cameroon women's national handball team

References

External links
 Official website  
 Cameroon at the IHF website.
 Cameroon at the CAHB website.

Handball in Cameroon
Handball
Sports organizations established in 1970
1970 establishments in Cameroon
Handball governing bodies
African Handball Confederation
National members of the International Handball Federation